"Ebeneezer Goode" is a song by Scottish electronic music group the Shamen which, heavily remixed by the Beatmasters, became their biggest hit when released as a single on 24 August 1992. The group's original version featured on the vinyl edition of their fifth album, Boss Drum.

"Ebeneezer Goode" was one of the most controversial UK number-one hits of the 1990s due to its perceived oblique endorsement of recreational drug use, and it was initially banned by the BBC. It has been claimed the single was eventually withdrawn after the band were hounded by the British tabloid press, though, according to The Shamen themselves, it was deleted while at number one due to its long chart run "messing up our release schedule".

Lyric
The song is best known for its chorus, "'Eezer Goode, 'Eezer Goode / He's Ebeneezer Goode", the first part of which is aurally identical to, "Es are good" – 'E' being common slang for the drug ecstasy. However, 'E' is also sung many other times during the song, ostensibly as 'e (i.e. he), such as in "E's sublime, E makes you feel fine". The lyric alludes to the advantages of the drug, though with an admonition against excessive use:

The song also contains references to the use of cannabis with ecstasy, referencing the rolling of a cannabis joint with the lines "Has anybody got any Veras?" ("Vera Lynns" being rhyming slang for "skins" or rolling papers) and "Got any salmon?" ("salmon and trout" being rhyming slang for "snout" or tobacco).
 
The "A great philosopher once wrote.." sample at the start of the song is Malcolm McDowell from Lindsay Anderson's 1973 film O Lucky Man!

Critical reception
Pan-European magazine Music & Media said the song "is a thinly disguised tribute to the drug XTC, although some might think it's about nice chocolates". They added, "Whatever the moralists may say — 'naughty, naughty' like the lyrics [sic] in the intro — it's a brilliantly constructed pop song with both radio and club appeal as proved before by other Euro-crossover hits such as Move Any Mountain and Love Sex Intelligence." Andy Beevers from Music Week commented, "Bringing together very authentic old-fashioned acid house sounds and a cheeky rap, this has instant appeal and is going to be a huge hit. A word of warning, however: it will make 'absolutely outrageous, mate' this summer's most irritating catchphrase." James Hamilton from the magazine's RM Dance Update described it as "pure corny pop with a laddishly spoken and chanted very silly vocal about a geezer what's called Ebeneezer, punctuated by "wicked mate" comments and Sid James-like guffaws" and a "twittery bleeping jaunty bounder".

Chart performance
The song entered the UK Singles Chart at number six in September 1992, climbing to number one two weeks later (ironically during the BBC's drug awareness week) and staying there for four weeks. It was the UK's 13th-biggest-selling single of 1992.

Music video
The music video for the song consisted of club scenes intermixed with a caped man (ostensibly Ebeneezer Goode himself, played by Jerry Sadowitz) running around parts of a city. Due to the use of flashing images in the video, some TV music channels make epilepsy warnings. Some channels, including VH1, edit the video to reduce the frame rate of these scenes, which deletes each bright frame.

The video was played in episode 5 and 6, season 3 of Beavis and Butt-head, "Kidnapped".

Performance on Top of the Pops
When the Shamen appeared on BBC1's Top of the Pops, Mr C was expected to tone down the song due to its being broadcast. The group replaced the final lyric "Got any salmon?" with "Has anyone got any underlay?" When later asked about this in a radio interview, he replied it referenced rugs, not drugs.

Charts and sales

Weekly charts

Year-end charts

Certifications and sales

References

1992 songs
1992 singles
Songs about drugs
The Shamen songs
UK Singles Chart number-one singles
Irish Singles Chart number-one singles
Music Week number-one dance singles
Number-one singles in Israel
Controversies in the United Kingdom
Obscenity controversies in music
1992 controversies
One Little Indian Records singles